= Mel Krantzler =

American psychologist

Melvin Harold "Mel" Krantzler (January 29, 1920 – October 31, 2011) was an American psychologist best known for his popular 1974 book, Creative Divorce, which remained on The New York Times Bestseller List for a year and sold three million copies. He also wrote Learning to Love Again and Creative Marriage.
